WISEPC J121756.91+162640.2 (designation abbreviated to WISE 1217+1626, or WISE J1217+1626) is a binary brown dwarf system of spectral classes T9 + Y0, located in constellation Coma Berenices at approximately 30.4 light-years from Earth.

History of observations

Discovery
WISE 1217+1626 A was discovered in 2011 by J. Davy Kirkpatrick et al. from data, collected by Wide-field Infrared Survey Explorer (WISE) Earth-orbiting satellite — NASA infrared-wavelength 40 cm (16 in) space telescope, which mission lasted from December 2009 to February 2011. In 2011 Kirkpatrick et al. published a paper in The Astrophysical Journal Supplement, where they presented discovery of 98 new found by WISE brown dwarf systems with components of spectral types M, L, T and Y, among which also was WISE 1217+1626.

Initial estimate of spectral type
Initial estimate of WISE 1217+1626' spectral type (before discovery of its binarity) was T9 (the same as the component's A type estimate made after this discovery).

Discovery of component B
WISE 1217+1626 B was discovered in 2012 by Liu et al. with laser guide star (LGS) adaptive optics (AO) system of the 10-m Keck II Telescope on Mauna Kea, Hawaii, using infrared camera NIRC2 (the observations were made on 2012 January 29 (UT)). On 2012 April 1 (UT) Liu et al. observed WISE J1217+1626AB using the near-IR camera NIRI on the Gemini-North 8.1-m telescope on Mauna Kea, Hawaii and the binary was marginally resolved. On 12 April 2012 (UT) they obtained resolved spectroscopy of WISE J1217+1626AB with the near-IR spectrograph NIRSPEC again on the Keck II Telescope. In 2012 Liu et al. published a paper in The Astrophysical Journal where they presented results of observations with Keck II LGS-AO of three brown dwarf binary systems, binarity of one of which was known before, and binarity of the other two, including WISE 1217+1626, was first presented in this paper.

Physical properties
Using three models, Liu et al. calculated physical properties of WISE 1217+1626 components for ages of 1 and 5 billion years. Later, models corresponding to age of the system equal to 1 billion years, were found to be poorly fitting and were discarded.

From Burrows et al. (2003) models and M(J):

From Lyon/COND models and M(J):

From Lyon/COND models and Lbol:

Both components have a thin cloud layers in atmosphere. Despite being cold enough to have a chloride and sulfide clouds in atmosphere, component B atmosphere is not as cloudy as expected, possibly because of the system been metal-poor.

See also
The other two brown dwarf binary systems, observed by Liu et al. with Keck II LGS-AO in 2012:
 WISE 1711+3500 (T8 + T9.5, binarity was newly discovered)
 CFBDSIR 1458+10 (T9 + Y0, binarity was known before)

Notes

References

Binary stars
Brown dwarfs
T-type stars
Y-type stars
Coma Berenices
WISE objects